Aleksander Peternel (born 20 October 1964) is a Slovenian freestyle skier. He competed in the men's moguls event at the 1992 Winter Olympics.

References

1964 births
Living people
Slovenian male freestyle skiers
Olympic freestyle skiers of Slovenia
Freestyle skiers at the 1992 Winter Olympics
People from Kranjska Gora